David E. Bruns (born September 17, 1959) is a Judge of the Kansas Court of Appeals.

Early life and education

Bruns was born September 17, 1959, in Kansas City, Kansas. He earned an Associate of Arts in pre-law from Kansas City Kansas Community College in 1979 and a Bachelor of Science in education from the University of Kansas in 1981. He received his Juris Doctor with honors from Washburn University School of Law in 1984.

Legal career

Upon admission to the practice of law in 1984, he joined the Topeka law firm of Goodell, Stratton, Edmonds and Palmer, LLP, where he became a partner in 1989. In private practice, he primarily handled litigation and health law cases in the state and federal courts of Kansas and Missouri.

State court service

In September 1999, Governor Bill Graves appointed him to serve as judge of the District Court of Shawnee County, Kansas. Judge Bruns was subsequently retained in office by the voters of Shawnee County in 2000, 2004 and 2008. As a trial court judge, he presided over a variety of cases, including the first grand jury convened in Shawnee County in more than 10 years and a multistate class action lawsuit involving one of the largest management-led buyouts in corporate history.

Appointment to Kansas  Court of Appeals

He was appointed to the court by Governor Sam Brownback on April 15, 2011. He was officially sworn in on June 3, 2011. Bruns was retained in office by the voters of Kansas in the 2012 and 2016 general elections. Since joining the appellate court in June 2011, Judge Bruns has authored more than 500 opinions.

Personal

Bruns and his wife, Shawn, have been married for more than 35 years. They have two adult children, a daughter-in-law, and a granddaughter.

See also 

 2020 Kansas elections

References

External links
Official Biography on Kansas Judicial Branch website

Living people
1959 births
20th-century American lawyers
21st-century American lawyers
21st-century American judges
Kansas Court of Appeals Judges
Kansas lawyers
Kansas state court judges
People from Kansas City, Kansas
University of Kansas alumni
Washburn University alumni